Riedelia is a genus of diatoms known from the fossil record, comprising approximately eight species. Many of the species were originally described under the closely allied genus Hemiaulus. Paleontologists Hans-Joachim Schrader and Juliane Fenner, working with fossil specimens obtained from Leg 38 of the Deep Sea Drilling Program in the Norwegian and Greenland Seas, decided that several previous descriptions of diatoms belonging to Hemiaulus were rightfully placed on Riedelia. Schrader and Fenner note that while Hemiaulus diatoms have polygonal areolated valves, Riedelia valves are punctate with isolated punctae. Additionally, Riedelia typically have two spines, while Hemiaulus have only one. These characteristics were used to justify the placement of these species in Riedelia.

Riedelia clavigera is known from fossils dating from the early Eocene to the middle Oligocene.

Species 
The valid species currently considered to belong to this genus are:
R. alata (Greville) H.J.Schrader & J.Fenner
R. altar (J.Brun) H.J.Schrader & J.Fenner
R. clavigera (A.Schmidt) H.J.Schrader & J.Fenner
R. longicornis (Greville) H.J.Schrader & J.Fenner
R. lyriformis (Greville) H.J.Schrader & J.Fenner
R. mirabilis Jousé
R. sublevata J.Fenner
R. tenuicornis (Greville) H.J.Schrader & J.Fenner

References 

†